Events from the year 1926 in Canada.

Incumbents

Crown 
 Monarch – George V

Federal government 
 Governor General – Julian Byng, 1st Viscount Byng of Vimy (until October 2) then Freeman Freeman-Thomas, 1st Marquess of Willingdon 
 Prime Minister – William Lyon Mackenzie King (until June 28) then Arthur Meighen (June 29 to September 25) then William Lyon Mackenzie King
 Chief Justice – Francis Alexander Anglin (Ontario)
 Parliament – 15th (7 January – 2 July) then 16th (from 9 December)

Provincial governments

Lieutenant governors 
Lieutenant Governor of Alberta – William Egbert 
Lieutenant Governor of British Columbia – Walter Cameron Nichol (until January 21) then Robert Randolph Bruce 
Lieutenant Governor of Manitoba – James Albert Manning Aikins (until October 9) then Theodore Arthur Burrows    
Lieutenant Governor of New Brunswick – William Frederick Todd 
Lieutenant Governor of Nova Scotia – James Cranswick Tory  
Lieutenant Governor of Ontario – Henry Cockshutt 
Lieutenant Governor of Prince Edward Island – Frank Richard Heartz 
Lieutenant Governor of Quebec – Narcisse Pérodeau
Lieutenant Governor of Saskatchewan – Henry William Newlands

Premiers 
Premier of Alberta – John Edward Brownlee      
Premier of British Columbia – John Oliver  
Premier of Manitoba – John Bracken 
Premier of New Brunswick – John Baxter 
Premier of Nova Scotia – Edgar Nelson Rhodes 
Premier of Ontario – George Howard Ferguson  
Premier of Prince Edward Island – James D. Stewart
Premier of Quebec – Louis-Alexandre Taschereau 
Premier of Saskatchewan – Charles Avery Dunning (until February 26) then James Garfield Gardiner

Territorial governments

Commissioners 
 Gold Commissioner of Yukon – Percy Reid 
 Commissioner of Northwest Territories – William Wallace Cory

Events 
February 24 – Robert Randolph Bruce becomes British Columbia's 13th Lieutenant Governor
February 26 – James Garfield Gardiner becomes premier of Saskatchewan, replacing Charles Dunning
June 24 – Monument aux Patriotes, Montreal unveiled
June 28 – The King-Byng Affair climaxes as William Lyon Mackenzie King resigns as prime minister. Arthur Meighen becomes prime minister for the second time, but an election is forced when Meighen fails to win the confidence of the House.
June 28 – 1926 Alberta general election: John Brownlee's United Farmers of Alberta win a second consecutive majority
July 1 – Canada moves back onto the gold standard
September 14 – Federal election: the coalition of Mackenzie King's Liberals and the Liberal-Progressives win a majority, defeating Arthur Meighen's Conservatives
September 25 – Mackenzie King becomes prime minister for the second time, replacing Arthur Meighen
November 18 – British Dominions given official autonomy in the Balfour Declaration of 1926
December 1 – Ontario election: Howard Ferguson's Conservatives win a second consecutive majority

Full date unknown
The Royal Canadian Mounted Police establish a base on Ellesmere Island as a proof of Canadian sovereignty.
The Saskatchewan Grain Growers Association amalgamates with the Farmers' Union of Canada to create the United Farmers of Canada.

Sport 
March 26 – The Calgary City Junior Hockey League's Calgary Canadians win their only Memorial Cup by defeating the Ontario Hockey Association's Queen's University 2 game to 1. All games were held at Shea's Amphitheatre in Winnipeg
April 6 – The National Hockey League's Montreal Maroons win their only Stanley Cup by defeating the Western Hockey League Victoria Cougars 3 games to 1. This was the last time a non-NHL team would contest for the Cup. The deciding game was played at the Montreal Forum
December 4 – The Ottawa Senators win their second Grey Cup by defeating the Toronto Varsity Blues 10 to 7 in the 14th Grey Cup played at Varsity Stadium

Arts and literature

Births

January to June
January 1 – Dean Bandiera, Canadian football player (d. 2020)
January 2 – John Stroppa, football player (d. 2017) 
January 3 – Murray Dowey, ice hockey player and Olympic champion (d. 2021)
January 4 – Betty Kennedy, broadcaster, journalist, author, Senator and gameshow panelist (d. 2017)
January 20 – John Michael Sherlock, Roman Catholic bishop (d. 2019)
January 26 – Georges-C. Lachance, politician and father of Claude-André Lachance (d. 2020)
February 4 – Roger Blais, engineer and academic (d. 2009)
February 6 – Ray Perrault, politician (d. 2008)
February 11 – Leslie Nielsen, comedian and actor (d. 2010)
February 20 – Jean Boucher, politician (d. 2011)
April 1 – Gérard La Forest, lawyer and judge
April 17 – Gerry McNeil, ice hockey player (d. 2004)
April 21 – Keith Davey, businessman and politician (d. 2011)
April 28 – Alex Oakley, race walker (d. 2010)
May 3 – Matt Baldwin, curler
May 13 – Joy Coghill, actress, director, and writer (d. 2017)
May 20 – Allan McEachern, lawyer, judge and university chancellor (d. 2008)
May 26 – Phyllis Gotlieb, science fiction novelist and poet (d. 2009)
June 3 – Flora MacDonald, politician (d. 2015)
June 7 – Jean-Noël Tremblay, lawyer and politician (d. 2020)
June 15 – Douglas Bell, politician (d. 2021)

July to December
July 14 – Wallace Diestelmeyer, figure skater (d. 1999)
July 18 – Margaret Laurence, novelist and short story writer (d. 1987)
July 21 – Norman Jewison, film director, producer, actor and founder of the Canadian Film Centre
July 22 – Paul Collins, long-distance runner (d. 1995)
August 13 – Dalton McGuinty Sr., politician and father of premier of Ontario Dalton McGuinty and the politician David McGuinty (d. 1990)
August 18 – Gordon Donaldson, author and journalist (d. 2001)
September 1 – James Reaney, poet, playwright and literary critic (d. 2008)
September 13 – Emile Francis, ice hockey player (d. 2022)
September 27 – Jack Duffy, actor and comedian (d. 2008)
October 1 – Ben Wicks, cartoonist, illustrator, journalist and author (d. 2000)
October 26 – George Crum, conductor, pianist, vocal coach and musical arranger (d. 2007)
November 8 – Kay Hawtrey, actress (d. 2021)
November 9 – Mary Louise Morrison, soprano
December 3 – Denise Morelle, actress and murder victim (d. 1984)

Full date unknown
Daniel McCarthy, television producer (The Friendly Giant, Mr. Dressup, Sesame Park) (d. 2013)

Deaths

January 31 – Paul Tourigny, politician (b. 1852)
February 2 – John Alexander Macdonald Armstrong, politician (b. 1877)
February 20 – Paul-Eugène Roy, Roman Catholic priest, and Archbishop of Quebec (b. 1859)
March 27 – Georges Vézina, ice hockey player (b. 1887)
June 23 – Nérée Le Noblet Duplessis, politician, 19th Mayor of Trois-Rivières and father of 16th Premier of Quebec Maurice Duplessis (b. 1855)
August 24 – Laurent-Olivier David, journalist, lawyer, and politician (b. 1840)

See also
 List of Canadian films

Historical documents
Prime Minister King's resignation letter urges Gov. Gen. Byng to rethink his refusal of King's advice to dissolve Parliament

King profoundly relieved that Byng took Meighen's advice to dissolve, "deliver[ing] himself so completely into my hands"

British government recognizes Canada's need of direct diplomatic relations with U.S.A.

Canada posts its first diplomatic representative in Washington

House committee studying minimum wage hears details of decent and unhealthy standards of living affordable on industrial wages

Tourist guide to Rocky Mountains resorts includes Banff, Lake Louise, Yoho, and Glacier parks, plus Vancouver and Victoria, B.C.

Exile-weary anarchist Emma Goldman hopes Canada will let her stay

Touching letter to stranger follows visit to her brother's grave in France

English immigrant loves slush-free winters and long summer days in Dawson City, Yukon

Instructions for bleaching out suntan

References

 
Years of the 20th century in Canada
Canada
1926 in North America